Bladon Springs is an unincorporated community in Choctaw County, Alabama, United States. The community grew up around and gained its name from the mineral springs that once were operated as a renowned hotel and spa, now within the modern Bladon Springs State Park. The community itself featured many ornate homes and cottages built as summer residences by people from other parts of the state and elsewhere.  Much of the community is part of the Bladon Springs Historic District, listed on the Alabama Register of Landmarks and Heritage on April 1, 1976.

In 1880 and 1890, Bladon Springs was listed on the U.S. Census as having 573 and 440 persons, making it the then-most populous community in Choctaw County.

Geography

Notable person
 Frank W. Boykin, U.S. Congressman for Alabama's 1st congressional district from 1935 to 1963

Gallery

References

Unincorporated communities in Alabama
Unincorporated communities in Choctaw County, Alabama